The men's team table tennis event was part of the table tennis programme and took place between October 1 and 5, at the Dongchun Gymnasium, Ulsan.

Schedule
All times are Korea Standard Time (UTC+09:00)

Results

Preliminary round

Group A

Group B

Group C

Group D

Knockout round

Quarterfinals

Semifinals

Final

Non-participating athletes

References 

2002 Asian Games Official Reports, Page 712
Official Website

Table tennis at the 2002 Asian Games